The Kumasi Central Mosque is a mosque in Kumasi, the capital city of the Ashanti Region in Ghana. The mosque serves as a place of worship for Muslims in the region. It is currently the largest mosque in the Ashanti Region and the second largest in Ghana after undergoing a major renovation that was solely financed by the Vice President of Ghana,  Dr. Mahamudu Bawumia.

History

The Kumasi Central Mosque was established in the early 1950s to cater to the growing Muslim population in the Ashanti Region. The mosque has undergone several renovations over the years to accommodate the increasing number of worshippers.

Renovation

In 2020, the Vice President of Ghana, Dr Mahamudu Bawumia, pledged to renovate the Kumasi Central Mosque after settling 56 years of accumulated lease arrears. The renovation project was aimed at improving the facilities at the mosque and making it more accessible to worshippers. The project was completed in early 2023 and the mosque was officially commissioned by the Vice President on March 3, 2023.

The commissioning event was attended by notable figures such as the Asantehene, Otumfuo Nana Osei Tutu II, National Chief Imam,  Sheikh Osman Nuhu Sharubutu, government officials, diplomats, regional Imams, Zongo Chiefs, and prominent Christian and Muslim religious leaders. 

The renovation resulted in a 7000-seater capacity mosque, a 100-capacity ablution center, 30 underground washrooms, 500-capacity conference hall, two-bedroom apartments, and 11 furnished offices, in addition to other electrical fittings. The Kumasi Central Mosque is currently the largest mosque in the Ashanti Region.

Architecture

The Kumasi Central Mosque has a unique architectural style that blends traditional Ghanaian and Islamic influences. The mosque is a rectangular building with a flat roof and a central dome and four minarets. The facade of the mosque features intricate geometric patterns and calligraphic inscriptions that are typical of Islamic architecture. The interior of the mosque is decorated with colorful mosaics and calligraphic inscriptions.

References

Buildings and structures in Kumasi
Mosques in Ghana